Iron Island is a 2005 Iranian drama film directed by Mohammad Rasoulof. It won the Golden Peacock (Best Film) at the 36th International Film Festival of India.

Synopsis
Old Captain Nemat runs a tight ship. This benevolent dictator is almost a father to the scores of poor, homeless, uneducated families who live on an immensely overcrowded tanker, anchored offshore.

Cast
 Ali Nassirian ...  Captain Nemat
 Hossein Farzi-Zadeh ...  Ahmad
 Neda Pakdaman ...  The girl

Reception
The film has a 97% approval rating on Rotten Tomatoes, with the critics’ consensus stated as, “A visually creative yet grounded film from Iran, Iron Island is a political allegory that packs a punch.”

References

External links

 

2005 films
Iranian drama films
2000s Persian-language films